Casso may refer to:

People
 Anthony Casso (1942–2020), American mobster
 Carmen Rosa Caso (born 1981), Dominican Republican volleyball player
 Edward Casso (born 1974), American politician

Places
 Casso, Pordenone, Italy
 Fort Casso or Ouvrage Rohrbach, France

See also
 Cassio (disambiguation)